Gloria Sofa Nibagwire (born 14 August 1982) is a Rwandan footballer who captains the Rwanda women's national team.

International career
Nibagwire capped for Rwanda at senior level during the 2014 African Women's Championship qualification.

References

1982 births
Living people
Rwandan women's footballers
Rwanda women's international footballers
Women's association footballers not categorized by position